Howard Helmer is a chef who is an advocate of cooking eggs. Raised in Chicago, he now lives in New York City where he promotes eggs to the culinary press.

Helmer currently holds the Guinness world record for the fastest omelette cooker, having made 427 omelets in :30 minutes. This feat was accomplished in Atlanta, Georgia in 1990. He also holds the world records for fastest omelet flipper.

Helmer has made appearances on the Food Network and Oprah and television programs around the world. He was also a spokesperson for the American Egg Board and, prior to his retirement, worked with his successor to that role, Jeffrey Saad.

In 2011, Helmer was invited to do a demonstration at the White House in a session called, "play with your food."

See also
 American Egg Board

References

Living people
American chefs
American male chefs
People from Chicago
People from New York City
Year of birth missing (living people)